Tautumeitas is a Latvian folk/world music band formed in 2015. The band consists of six women vocalists and instrumentalists.

History 

In 2017 Tautumeitas together with Auļi released a 13-track album Lai māsiņa rotājās! dedicated to engagements and weddings. The album received Annual Latvian Music Recording Award as the Best Folk music album of 2017. Lai māsiņa rotājās! also reached position No. 26 in the 2018 World Music Charts Europe, as well as No. 38 in the April 2018 and May 2018 Transglobal World Music Chart. In 2018 Tautumeitas released their self-titled debut album.

On 2 June 2021, Tautumeitas announced on their official Instagram account that Lauma Bērza would leave the group in the summer.

Members

Current members 
Asnate Rancāne – violin, vocals
Aurēlija Rancāne – drums, vocals
Ilona Dzērve — accordion, vocals
Laura Vārpiņa – percussion, vocals
Laura Marta Līcīte – percussion, vocals
Gabriēla Zvaigznīte - vocals

Past members 

Lauma Bērza – violin, vocals
Laura Bužinska

Discography 
 Lai māsiņa rotājās! (2017; with Auļi)
 Tautumeitas (2018)
 Dziesmas no Aulejas (2019)

References

External links 
Official website 

2015 establishments in Latvia
Latvian folk music groups
Latvian world music groups
Musical groups established in 2015